Crew, the band, was formed in 1965 in London, England, by John Wright as lead vocalist and percussionist specializing on congas.

In 1969, the songs "Marty" and "Danger Signs", written by Richard Hartop, were recorded and released on Plexium and, in 1970, the band recorded a ska version of Paul Simon's "Cecilia" and "1970" by Jonathan King released on Decca.

In 1971, John reformed the band with, lyricist Jon Newey (bongos, claves, congas, maracas), John Chichester (electric guitar and vocals), Ian Rutter (bass guitar), Tony Perry (organ and vocals) and songwriter Martin Samuel (drums and percussion).

The band then signed with The Space Agency, in Chelsea, London, for management and representation and worked consistently including at such notable London venues as The Marquee Club and The Roundhouse.
Signed to the same agency, Crew often performed as part of the Emperor Rosko International Roadshow.

The Crew, known as a funking good band for their style of original percussive-led progressive rock funk music, broke up in 1972.

References 

Crew at 45Cat
Crew at Plexium Record Co.
Crew at Decca Record Co., UK
Crew at Decca Record Co., Italy
Crew at Decca Record Co., Kenya
Crew at Vergara Record Co., Spain

External links

Crew Discogs
Crew 45Cat

Sources
Martin Samuel - Crew (band) songwriter and drummer 1971-1972.
Jon Newey - Crew (band) lyricist and percussionist 1971-1972.
Crew 45Cat
 Discogs

English pop music groups
English dance music groups
Musical groups from London
Musical groups established in 1965